Socialist German Workers Youth (abbreviated SDAJ) is a political youth organization in Germany. It is a Marxist–Leninist organization and related to the Deutsche Kommunistische Partei (German Communist Party). SDAJ is a member of World Federation of Democratic Youth.

History

1968–1977 
SDAJ was formed on May 5, 1968, the 150th birthday of Karl Marx. The SDAJ participated in social movements that arose from 1968's student movement. It became one of the leading left-wing youth organizations in West Germany and enjoyed a high political profile – for example, in actions against fare increases ("Red Dot Actions"). The SDAJ claimed over 35,000 members.

1978–1987 
From 1978 to 1988, the SDAJ organized the Festival of Youth biannually together with the Marxist Student Association Spartacus (MSB). The Festival was held mid-May on the grounds of the Dortmund exhibition. Internationally known artists attended. For example, the 1978 festival included figures such as Jutta Weinhold, Snowball, Udo Lindenberg, Pudys and the Titi Winterstein Quintet. Political debates were a common feature. According to the SDAJ, more than 100,000 visitors attended.

Until the fall of the GDR, the SDAJ maintained contact with Free German Youth (FDJ), a sibling organization.

In the 1980s, the SDAJ played a major role in the West German peace movement.

1988–1997 
In 1988, conflicts emerged in SDAJ and DKP as reformist tendencies gained strength. At the SDAJ Federal Congress of 1989 the organization split, as the majority of the delegates voted for a proposal that would keep the SDAJ as a Marxist working class youth organization. The defeated faction grouped around then national chairman Birgit Radow and left the Congress. The Radow group failed to create a nationwide organization. Many former leading members switched to the youth structures of the PDS.

The fall of the GDR and the reunification of Germany, produced a crisis in SDAJ and DKP. Funding from GDR was discontinued and employees were laid off. Until about 1993, the SDAJ remained virtually without functioning central coordination. In 1994 the reorganization and reactivation of district and local associations began. As of the late 1990s local groups stabilized and new groups established in areas including Leipzig, Dresden, Gera, Potsdam, Rostock, Gadebusch and Berlin.

1998–present
Due to the slight increase in membership, the bi-annual Festival of Youth was refounded in 2008 in Jugendpark of Cologne.

In October 2011, the SDAJ held its 20th national congress of Hanover, Lower Saxony.

References

External links 
 

Youth wings of communist parties
Youth wings of political parties in Germany